Octomeria grandiflora is a species of orchid endemic to Brazil (São Paulo to Paraná).

References

External links 

grandiflora
Endemic orchids of Brazil
Orchids of São Paulo (state)
Orchids of Paraná (state)